Kinnunen is a Finnish surname. Notable people with the surname include:

Caitlin Kinnunen (born 1991), American actress
Heikki Kinnunen (born 1946), Finnish actor
Jarkko Kinnunen (born 1984), Finnish racewalker
Jorma Kinnunen (born 1941), Finnish athlete
Keith Thomas Kinnunen (born 1976), perpetrator of the West Freeway Church of Christ shooting
Kimmo Kinnunen (born 1968), Finnish javelin thrower
Laila Kinnunen (1939–2000), Finnish singer
Leo Kinnunen (1943–2017), Finnish racing driver
Mike Kinnunen (born 1958), American baseball player
Mikko Kinnunen (born 1967), Finnish politician
Nastassia Kinnunen (born 1985), Finnish-Belarusian cross-country skier and biathlete
Tapio Kinnunen (born 1954), Finnish weightlifter
Tero Kinnunen (born 1973), Finnish heavy metal musician
Tuija Kinnunen (born 1965), Finnish cyclist

Finnish-language surnames